The Hebrew University of Jerusalem (HUJI) is a public research university based in Jerusalem, Israel. Co-founded by Albert Einstein and Dr. Chaim Weizmann in July 1918, the public university officially opened in April 1925. It is the second-oldest Israeli university, having been founded 30 years before the establishment of the State of Israel but six years after the older Technion university. The HUJI has three campuses in Jerusalem and one in Rehovot. The world's largest library for Jewish studies—the National Library of Israel—is located on its Edmond J. Safra campus in the Givat Ram neighbourhood of Jerusalem.

The university has five affiliated teaching hospitals (including the Hadassah Medical Center), seven faculties, more than 100 research centers, and 315 academic departments. , one-third of all the doctoral candidates in Israel were studying at the HUJI.

Among its first few board of governors were Albert Einstein, Sigmund Freud, Martin Buber, and Chaim Weizmann. Four of Israel's prime ministers are alumni of the university. , 15 Nobel Prize winners (8 alumni and teachers), two Fields Medalists (one alumnus), and three Turing Award winners have been affiliated with the HUJI.

History

One of the visions of the Zionist movement was the establishment of a Jewish university in the Land of Israel. Founding a university was proposed as far back as 1884 in the Kattowitz (Katowice) conference of the Hovevei Zion society, and by Hermann Schapira at the First Zionist Congress of 1897.

The cornerstone for the university was laid on July 24, 1918. Seven years later, on April 1, 1925, the Hebrew University campus on Mount Scopus was opened at a gala ceremony attended by the leaders of the Jewish world, distinguished scholars and public figures, and British dignitaries, including the Earl of Balfour, Viscount Allenby, Winston Churchill and Sir Herbert Samuel. The university's first chancellor was Judah Magnes, who led the school as chancellor from 1924 to 1935. In 1935 to 1948 he led the school as president.

One of the most controversial issues during the conceptualization of the university regarded its future official language. Whereas one side, the so-called “Germanists”, proposed a combination of German and Arabic for all non-Jewish subjects, the other side opted for the general use of Hebrew. The former party was afraid the very recent Modern Hebrew might not yet allow high-level academic discussions since it still suffered from a lack of specific technical terms in non-religious contexts. Although this concern can not simply be dismissed as unreasonable, the representatives of this position underestimated the symbolic significance of Hebrew for many Jews, not least of all for those outside the academia. Therefore, they were not able to prevail in the discussion and had to give in to the decision that the new university would be an explicitly Hebrew one. The question, what would define the specific Hebrew character of the university did not only regard the choice of an official language but also organizational aspects, as for example the establishment of departments and the definition of their respective research areas, and the outline of its overall academic profile. Therefore, in 1919, Shmaryahu Levin inquired a number of prominent Jewish European scholars about their opinions on the subject. One of the respondents was Ignaz Goldziher whose proposals were at least partly implemented: oriental languages, Jewish literature, and archaeology were among the first subjects studied at the university.

By 1947, the university had become a large research and teaching institution. Sir Leon Simon was Acting President from 1948 to 1949, and he was succeeded as president by Professor Selig Brodetsky, who served from 1949 to 1952. Plans for a medical school were approved in May 1949, and in November 1949, a faculty of law was inaugurated. In 1952, it was announced that the agricultural institute founded by the university in 1940 would become a full-fledged faculty.

During the 1948 Arab–Israeli War, attacks were carried out against convoys moving between the Israeli-controlled section of Jerusalem and the university. The leader of the Arab forces in Jerusalem, Abdul Kader Husseini, threatened military action against the university Hadassah Hospital "if the Jews continued to use them as bases for attacks." After the April 1948 Hadassah medical convoy massacre, in which 79 Jews, including doctors and nurses, were killed, the Mount Scopus campus was cut off from Jerusalem. British soldier Jack Churchill coordinated the evacuation of 700 Jewish doctors, students and patients from the hospital.

When the Jordanian government denied Israeli access to Mount Scopus, a new campus was built at Givat Ram in western Jerusalem and completed in 1958. In the interim, classes were held in 40 different buildings around the city. Benjamin Mazar was President of the university from 1953 to 1961, Giulio Racah was Acting President from 1961 to 1962, and Eliahu Eilat was president from 1962 to 1968.

The Terra Santa building in Rehavia, rented from the Franciscan Custodians of the Latin Holy Places, was also used for this purpose. A few years later, together with the Hadassah Medical Organization, a medical science campus was built in the south-west Jerusalem neighborhood of Ein Kerem.

By the beginning of 1967, the students numbered 12,500, spread among the two campuses in Jerusalem and the agricultural faculty in Rehovot. After the unification of Jerusalem, following the Six-Day War of June 1967, the university was able to return to Mount Scopus, which was rebuilt. According to ARIJ, Israel confiscated 568 Dunams of land from the Palestinian village of Isawiya for the Hebrew University in 1968. In 1981 the construction work was completed, and Mount Scopus again became the main campus of the university. Avraham Harman was President of the university from 1968 to 1983, Don Patinkin from 1983 to 1986, Amnon Pazy from 1986 to 1990, Yoram Ben-Porat from 1990 to 1992, Hanoch Gutfreund from 1992 to 1997, and Menachem Magidor from 1997 to 2009.

On July 31, 2002, a member of a terrorist cell detonated a bomb during lunch hour at the university's "Frank Sinatra" cafeteria when it was crowded with staff and students. Nine people—five Israelis, three Americans, and one dual French-American citizen—were murdered and more than 70 wounded. World leaders, including Kofi Annan, President George W. Bush, and the EU's High Representative Javier Solana issued statements of condemnation.

Menachem Ben-Sasson was President of the university from 2009 to 2017, succeeded by Asher Cohen in 2017.

In 2017 the Hebrew University of Jerusalem launched a marijuana research center, intended to "conduct and coordinate research on cannabis and its biological effects with an eye toward commercial applications."

Campuses

Mount Scopus

Mount Scopus (Hebrew: Har HaTzofim הר הצופים), in the north-eastern part of Jerusalem, is home to the main campus, which contains the Faculties of Humanities, Social Sciences, Law, Jerusalem School of Business Administration, Seymour Fox School of Education, Baerwald School of Social Work, Harry S. Truman Research Institute for the Advancement of Peace, Rothberg International School, and the Mandel Institute of Jewish Studies.

The Rothberg International School features secular studies and Jewish/Israeli studies. Included for foreign students is also a mandatory Ulpan program for Hebrew language study which includes a mandatory course in Israeli culture and customs. All Rothberg Ulpan classes are taught by Israeli natives. However, many other classes at the Rothberg School are taught by Jewish immigrants to Israel.

The land on Mt. Scopus was purchased before World War I from Sir John Gray-Hill, along with the Gray-Hill mansion. The master plan for the university was designed by Patrick Geddes and his son-in-law, Frank Mears in December 1919. Only two buildings of this original scheme were built: the David Wolffsohn University and National Library, and the Mathematics Institute, with the Physics Institute probably being built to the designs of their Jerusalem-based partner, Benjamin Chaikin.

Housing for students at Hebrew University who live on Mount Scopus is located at the three dormitories located near the university. These are the Maiersdorf (מאירסדורף) dormitories, the Bronfman (ברונפמן) dormitories, and the Kfar HaStudentim (כפר הסטודנטים, Student Village).

Nearby is the Nicanor Cave, an ancient cave that was planned to be a national pantheon.

Paul Baerwald School of Social Work and Social Welfare
The first Bachelor of Social Work in Israel, the school was founded in 1958.  The school was named after Paul Baerwald a leader of the Jewish Distribution Committee (JDC). The JDC was an initial funder of the school along with the Ministry of Welfare and the Tel Aviv Municipality. A new self-standing building was dedicated on the Givat Ram university campus in April 1967. The school has been called “the leader in training and research in the fields of social work and social policy.”. It has been ranked the highest rated school of social work in Israel.  The Master of Social Work was introduced in 1970.  The school houses the Israel Gerontological Data Center, Nevet- Greenhouse of Context-Informed Research and Training for Children in Need, The Center for the Study of Philanthropy in Israel, The Resilience Research Group.

Edmond J. Safra, Givat Ram

The Givat Ram campus (recently renamed after Edmond Safra) is the home of the Faculty of Science including the Einstein Institute of Mathematics; the Alexander Silberman Institute of Life Sciences; the Israel Institute for Advanced Studies, the Center for the Study of Rationality, as well as the National Library of Israel, (JNUL).

Ein Kerem
The Faculties of Medicine and Dental Medicine and the Institute For Medical Research, Israel-Canada (IMRIC) are located at the south-western Jerusalem Ein Kerem campus alongside the Hadassah-University Medical Center.

Rehovot

The Robert H. Smith Faculty of Agriculture, Food and Environment and the Koret School of Veterinary Medicine are located in the city of Rehovot in the coastal plain. The Faculty was established in 1942 and the School of Veterinary Medicine opened in 1985. These are the only institutions of higher learning in Israel that offer both teaching and research programs in their respective fields. The Faculty is a member of the Euroleague for Life Sciences.

Libraries
The Hebrew University libraries and their web catalogs can be accessed through the HUJI Library Authority portal.

Jewish National and University Library
The Jewish National and University Library is the central and largest library of the Hebrew University and one of the most impressive book and manuscript collections in the world. It is also the oldest section of the university. Founded in 1892 as a world center for the preservation of books relating to Jewish thought and culture, it assumed the additional functions of a general university library in 1920. Its collections of Hebraica and Judaica are the largest in the world. It houses all materials published in Israel, and attempts to acquire all materials published in the world related to the country. It possesses over five million books and thousands of items in special sections, many of which are unique. Among these are the Albert Einstein Archives, Hebrew manuscripts department, Eran Laor map collection, Edelstein science collection, Gershom Scholem collection, and a collection of Maimonides' manuscripts and early writings.

In his will, Albert Einstein left the Hebrew University his personal papers and the copyright to them. The Albert Einstein Archives contain some 55,000 items.  In March, 2012 the university announced that it had digitized the entire archive, and was planning to make it more accessible online.  Included in the collection are his personal notes, love letters to various women, including the woman who would become his second wife, Elsa.

Subject-based libraries

In addition to the National Library, the Hebrew University operates subject-based libraries on its campuses, among them the Avraham Harman Science Library, Safra, Givat Ram; Mathematics and Computer Science Library, Safra, Givat Ram; Earth Sciences Library, Safra, Givat Ram; Muriel and Philip I. Berman National Medical Library, Ein Kerem; Central Library of Agricultural Science, Rehovot; Bloomfield Library for the Humanities and Social Sciences, Mt. Scopus; Bernard G. Segal Law Library Center, Mt. Scopus; Emery and Claire Yass Library of the Institute of Archaeology, Mt. Scopus; Moses Leavitt Library of Social Work, Mt. Scopus; Zalman Aranne Central Education Library, Mt. Scopus; Library of the Rothberg School for International Students, Mt. Scopus; Roberta and Stanley Bogen Library of the Harry S. Truman Research Institute for the Advancement of Peace, Mt. Scopus; and the Steven Spielberg Jewish Film Archive.

Rankings
According to the Academic Ranking of World Universities, the Hebrew University is the top university in Israel, overall between 101st and 150th best university in the world, between 301st and 400th in physics, between 201st and 300th in computer science, and between 51st and 75th in business/economics. 

In 2021, Shanghai Ranking and the Center for World University Rankings ranked the Hebrew University 1st in Israel in its World University Rankings (90th according to Shanghai Ranking and 64th in the world according to the Center for World University Rankings).

The Hebrew University consistently ranks as Israel's best university in mathematics, and among the best worldwide. It was ranked as the 11th best institution in mathematics worldwide in 2017, 19th best in 2018, 21st best in 2019, and 25th best in 2020.

Friends of the University
The university has an international Society of Friends organizations covering more than 25 countries. Canadian Friends of the Hebrew University of Jerusalem (CFHU), founded in 1944 by Canadian philanthropist Allan Bronfman, promotes awareness, leadership and financial support for The Hebrew University of Jerusalem. CFHU facilitates academic and research partnerships between Canada and Israel as well as establishing scholarships, supporting research, cultivating student and faculty exchanges and recruiting Canadian students to attend the Rothberg International School.  CFHU has chapters in Montreal, Ottawa, Toronto, Winnipeg, Edmonton, Calgary and Vancouver.

The American Friends of the Hebrew University (AFHU) is a not-for-profit 501(c)3 organization that provides programs, events and fundraising activities in support of the university. It was founded by the American philanthropist, Felix M. Warburg in 1925. Supported by its founder, Stephen Floersheimer, and headed by Eran Razin, Floersheimer Studies is a singular program, publishing studies in the field of society, governance and space in Israel. It was established in 2007 replacing the Floersheimer Institute for Policy Studies of 1991.

Faculty

Dorit Aharonov, computer science
Joshua David Angrist, economist, 2021 Nobel Prize laureate for Economics
Lydia Aran, scholar of Buddhism
Robert Aumann, 2005 Nobel Prize laureate for Economics
Shlomo Avineri, Political Science
Yishai Bar, law
Yehoshua Bar-Hillel, linguistics
 Yaacov Bar-Siman-Tov, international relations
Aharon Barak,  former President of the Israeli Supreme Court
Yehuda Bauer, Holocaust history
Jacob Bekenstein, physics
Norman Bentwich, international relations
Ernst David Bergmann, chairman of Israeli Atomic Energy Commission
Martin Buber, religion & Jewish philosophy
Howard Cedar, chairperson, Developmental Biology & Cancer Research, IMRIC
Ilan Chet, agricultural biotechnology
Richard I. Cohen, history
Avishai Dekel Andre Aisenstadt Chair of Theoretical Physics
Shmuel Eisenstadt, sociology
Menachem Elon, former deputy president of the Israeli Supreme Court
Adolf Abraham Halevi Fraenkel, mathematics
Hillel Furstenberg, mathematics, Israel Prize winner
Leah Goldberg (1911–1970), poet
Eliezer E. Goldschmidt, agriculture
Asher Dan Grunis, Supreme Court Justice
Louis Guttman, social sciences and statistics
Ephraim Halevy, Mossad chief
Lumír Ondřej Hanuš, analytic chemist
Yuval Noah Harari, history
Gabriel Herman, Historian
Gabriel Horenczyk, psychologist, faculty member of the Melton Centre for Jewish Education and the School of Education.
Daniel Kahneman, 2002 Nobel Prize laureate for Economics
Ruth Kark, geography of (Eretz) Israel
Elihu Katz, communication
Aharon Katzir, chemistry
David Kazhdan, mathematics
Baruch Kimmerling, sociology
Roger D. Kornberg, visiting professor, 2006 Nobel Prize laureate for chemistry
David Kretzmer, law
Ruth Lapidoth, law
Ruth Lawrence, mathematics
Hava Lazarus-Yafeh (1930–1998), Orientalist, head of the Department for Islamic Civilization, Israel Prize winner
Yeshayahu Leibowitz, biochemistry and Jewish philosophy
Raphael D. Levine, chemist
Avigdor Levontin, law
Nehemia Levtzion (1935—2003), scholar of African history, Near East, Islamic, and African studies, President of the Open University of Israel, and executive director of the Van Leer Jerusalem Institute
Amia Lieblich, psychology
Elon Lindenstrauss, mathematics, laureate of the 2010 Fields Medal
Joram Lindenstrauss, mathematics, Israel Prize winner
Avishai Margalit, philosophy Israel Prize winner
Amihai Mazar, archaeology, Israel Prize winner
Benjamin Mazar. archaeologist, Israel Prize winner, former university president and rector
 Jacob (Kobi) Metzer, economic historian, professor, and the eighth president of the Open University of Israel
Eugen Mittwoch, semitic languages, guest professor in 1924 (famous as head of German Nachrichtenstelle in World War I)
George Mosse, history
Bezalel Narkiss, art history
Amnon Netzer, Jewish studies and history
Ehud Netzer (1934–2010), archaeology
Yaakov Nahmias, bioengineering
Anat Ninio, psychology
Mordechai Nisan, education
Dan Pagis, literature
Nurit Peled-Elhanan, education
Tsvi Piran, astrophysics
Joshua Prawer, history
Michael O. Rabin, computer science and mathematics, Israel Prize winner and recipient of the Turing Award.
Giulio Racah, physics
Frances Raday, law
Aharon Razin, Researcher, IMRIC
Eliyahu Rips, mathematics
Mordechai Rotenberg, social work
Gershom Scholem, Jewish mysticism
Eliezer Schweid, Jewish philosophy
Ehud de Shalit, number theorist
Zlil Sela, mathematics
Nir Shaviv, astrophysics
Saharon Shelah, mathematics
Avigdor Shinan, Hebrew literature
Avraham Steinberg, medical ethics
Zeev Sternhell, political science
Hayim Tadmor, Assyriology
Jacob Talmon, history
Gadi Taub, social sciences
Amos Tversky, psychology
Claude Vigée, French literature
Avi Wigderson, computer science and mathematics
Joseph Yahalom, Hebrew poetry
S. Yizhar, writer

Publications

Institute of Archaeology, Mt. Scopus
 Qedem: Monographs of the Institute of Archaeology
 Qedem Reports

Notable alumni

Major award laureates
Fields Medal laureate: Elon Lindenstrauss (2010)
Nobel Prize laureates: Daniel Kahneman (economics 2002), David Gross (physics 2004), Avram Hershko (chemistry 2004), Aaron Ciechanover (chemistry 2004), Robert Aumann (economics 2005), Roger D. Kornberg (chemistry 2006), and Ada Yonath (chemistry 2009)
Turing Award laureates: Michael O. Rabin (1976), Richard E. Stearns (1993), Shafi Goldwasser (2012)

Political leaders
Ambassador Yael Rubinstein
Members of the Knesset: Colette Avital, Yael Dayan, Taleb el-Sana, Dalia Itzik, Roman Bronfman, David Rotem, Ahmed Tibi, Avigdor Lieberman, Dov Khenin, Danny Danon, Shulamit Aloni, Rachel Adato, Ze'ev Elkin, Roni Bar-On, Ze'ev Bielski, Yohanan Plesner, Yuval Steinitz, Dan Meridor, Yisrael Katz, Jamal Zahalka, Shai Hermesh, Zvulun Orlev, Menachem Ben-Sasson, Ya'akov Ne'eman, Geulah Cohen, Bechor-Shalom Sheetrit, Orit Farkash-Hacohen
Jerusalem city council members: Ofer Berkovitch
Presidents of Israel: Ephraim Katzir, Yitzhak Navon, Moshe Katsav,  Reuven Rivlin
Prime Ministers of Israel: Ehud Barak, Ariel Sharon, Ehud Olmert, Naftali Bennett
Supreme Court Justices: Aharon Barak, Dorit Beinisch, Menachem Elon, Elyakim Rubinstein, Meir Shamgar, Jacob Turkel, Yitzhak Zamir, Salim Joubran, Uri Shoham

By profession
Academics: Emanuel Adler, Michael Albeck, Yoram Ben-Porat, Ahron Bregman, Richard I. Cohen, Uri Davis, Amitai Etzioni, Esther Farbstein, Gerson Goldhaber, Daphna Hacker, Haim Harari, Jose Itzigsohn, Joshua Jortner, Efraim Karsh, Asa Kasher, Walter Laqueur, Alexander Levitzki, Saul Lieberman, Avishai Margalit, Jacob (Kobi) Metzer, Dianne Neumark-Sztainer, Dana Olmert, Neri Oxman, Dana Pe'er, Uriel Reichman, Joshua Ronen, Miri Rubin, Ariel Rubinstein, Eli Salzberger, Amit Schejter, Michael Sela, Igal Talmi, Benjamin Elazari Volcani, Menahem Yaari, Reuven Avi-Yonah, Ada Yonath
Activists: Dorit Reiss, Elie Yossef
Anthropologist: Eliane Karp
Archaeologists: Ruth Amiran, Trude Dothan, Aren Maeir, Amihai Mazar, Benjamin Mazar, Eilat Mazar, Yigael Yadin
Astronomers: David H. Levy
Biology and biochemistry: Sarah Spiegel (1974)
Botanists:  Daniel Chamovitz, Alexander Eig
Business: Kobi Alexander (former CEO and founder of Comverse Technology), Léo Apotheker (former CEO of Hewlett-Packard and SAP), Dina Dublon (board member of Microsoft, Accenture and PepsiCo), Maxine Fassberg (former CEO of Intel Israel), Orit Gadiesh (Chairman of Bain & Company), Eli Hurvitz (CEO 1976–2002 Teva Pharmaceuticals), Gil Shwed (CEO and chairman Check Point Software Technologies), Jonathan Kestenbaum, Baron Kestenbaum, chief operating officer of investment trust RIT Capital Partners, and a Labour member of the House of Lords
Chemists: Yitzhak Apeloig, Adam Heller, Dan Meyerstein, Moshe Ron, Renata Reisfeld
Climatologists: Amaelle Landais-Israël
Educators: Brother Rafael S. Donato FSC, Ed.D., was a Filipino De La Salle Brother and was the past President of De La Salle University Manila, University of St. La Salle, De La Salle Lipa, La Salle Green Hills and De La Salle Araneta University.
Film, theatre, show business: Joseph Cedar, Natalie Portman, Uri Zohar
Foreign service: Naomi Ben-Ami, Gabriela Shalev, Rafael Harpaz, Zion Evrony
Journalists: Khaled Abu Toameh, Ron Ben-Yishai, Nahum Barnea, Boaz Evron, Amos Kenan, Sayed Kashua, Amira Hass, Akiva Eldar, Yossi Melman, Meron Benvenisti, Tom Segev, Haviv Rettig, Dan Margalit, Ya'akov Ahimeir, Michael Bar-Zohar, David Witzthum, Haim Gouri, Ehud Yaari, Zvi Yehezkeli
Historians: Esther Farbstein, Yuval Noah Harari, Itamar Rabinovich, Ron Robin
Law
Judges: Elisheva Barak-Ussoskin
Lawyers: Yoram Dinstein, Meir Shmuel Gabay, Elias Khoury, Menachem Mazuz, Ya'akov Ne'eman, Itzhak Nener, Malcolm Shaw
Law professor: Dorit Reiss
Mathematicians: Rami Grossberg (1986), Joram Lindenstrauss (1962), Moshe Machover (1962), Menachem Magidor, Amnon Pazy, Oded Schramm (1987), Saharon Shelah (1969)
Physicists: Amikam Aharoni, David Gross, Haim Harari, Max Jammer, Igal Talmi, Micha Tomkiewicz
Psychologists: Shlomo Breznitz, Asher Cohen, Esther Perel
Religion: Jonathan Markovitch, Chief rabbi of Kyiv
Clergy: Malcolm Ranjith, Archbishop of the Roman Catholic Archdiocese of Colombo, 2nd Sri Lankan to be made a cardinal, Patriarch Theophilos III of Jerusalem
Theologians: Fr Malachi Martin, Yigal Arnon
Soldiers: Yishai Beer, Uzi Dayan, Yuval Neria, Yonatan "Yoni" Netanyahu
Sports: Itzik Kornfein, Shaul Ladany, Adin Talbar, Yochanan Vollach
Writers: Yehuda Amichai, Galila Ron-Feder Amit, Aharon Appelfeld, Netiva Ben-Yehuda, Elias Chacour, Yael Dayan, Yuval Elizur, Helen Epstein, Jonah Frankel, David Grossman, Dmitry Glukhovsky, Batya Gur, Shifra Horn, Amos Oz, A. B. Yehoshua, Amnon Jackont, Amalia Kahana-Carmon, Yehoshua Kenaz, Miriam Roth, Amir Segal, Anton Shammas, Gideon Telpaz, Natan Yonatan

Yissum Research Development Company
Yissum Research Development Company is the university's technology transfer company, founded in 1964. Yissum owns all the intellectual property of the researchers and employees of the Hebrew University. Since its formation Yissum has founded more than 80 spin-off companies such as: Mobileye, BriefCam, HumanEyes, OrCam, ExLibris, BioCancell, NewStem and many more. Yissum is led by Yaacov Michlin and other leaders in the business industry such as: Tamir Huberman, Dov Reichman, Shoshi Keinan, Ariela Markel and Michal Levy. Yissum is also a member of ITTN (Israel Technology Transfer Organization).

See also

Einstein Papers Project
Yehezkel Kaufman
List of Israeli universities and colleges
Punjabi University

References

External links

Official website

Friends of The Hebrew University
 American Friends of the Hebrew University
 British Friends of The Hebrew University (BFHU)
 Canadian Friends of The Hebrew University (CFHU)

Alumni
 The European Alumni of The Hebrew University

 
Law schools in Israel
Research institutes in Israel
Universities in Israel
Universities and colleges in Jerusalem
Mount Scopus
1925 establishments in Mandatory Palestine
Erich Mendelsohn buildings
Buildings and structures in Rehovot